Desire of the Rhino King is a compilation album released in 1991 by experimental rock musician and guitarist Adrian Belew. It includes songs from Belew's first three solo albums for Island Records: Lone Rhino (1982), Twang Bar King (1983), and Desire Caught By the Tail (1986).

Track 18 is an outtake from the Desire sessions, appearing for the first time on CD.  It was first released on a Flexi disc included with the March 1987 issue of Guitar Player.

Track listing

Personnel

Musicians
 Adrian Belew – guitar, percussion, piano, drums, vocals,   
 Audie Belew – piano  
 Christy Bley – keyboards, vocals  
 Larrie Londin – drums  
 Clif Mayhugh – bass, vocals    
 Bill Janssen – saxophone, vocals

Technical
 Adrian Belew – producer, liner notes, cover art concept
 Stan Hertzman – executive producer, photography
 Gary Platt – engineer  
 Rich Denhart – assistant engineer
 Greg Calbi – remastering
 Christine Rodin – photography  
 Margaret Belew – cover design, cover art

References

Adrian Belew albums
1991 compilation albums
Albums produced by Adrian Belew
PolyGram compilation albums